Beysovo (Bäyes) is a rural locality (a village) in Arkh-Latyshsky Selsoviet, Arkhangelsky District, Bashkortostan, Russia. The population was 96 as of 2010. There are 2 streets.

Geography 
Beysovo is located 6 km southeast of Arkhangelskoye (the district's administrative centre) by road. Mullakayevo is the nearest rural locality.

References 

Rural localities in Arkhangelsky District